In French mythology or folklore, Dames Blanches (meaning literally white ladies) were female spirits or supernatural beings, comparable to the Weiße Frauen of both Dutch and German mythology. The Dames Blanches were reported in the region of Lorraine (Lotharingen) and Normandy. They appear (as Damas blancas, in Occitan), in the Pyrenees mountains, where they were supposed to appear near caves and caverns.

Thomas Keightley (1870) describes the Dames Blanches as a type of Fée known in Normandy "who are of a less benevolent character." They lurk in narrow places such as ravines, forest, and on bridges, and try to attract passerby attention. They may require one to join in her dance or assist her in order to pass. If assisted she "makes him many courtesies, and then vanishes." One such Dame was known as La Dame d'Apringy who appeared in a ravine at the Rue Quentin at Bayeux in Normandy, where one must dance with her a few rounds to pass. Those who refused were thrown into the thistles and briar, while those who danced were not harmed. Another Dame was known on a narrow bridge in the district of Falaise, named the Pont d'Angot. She only allowed people to pass if they went on their knees to her. Anyone who refused was tormented by the lutins, cats, owls, and other creatures who helped her.

Origins
J. A. MacCulloch believes Dames Blanches are one of the recharacterizations of pre-Christian female goddesses, and suggested their name Dame may have derived from the ancient guardian goddesses known as the Matres, by looking at old inscriptions to guardian goddesses, specifically inscriptions to "the Dominæ, who watched over the home, perhaps became the Dames of mediæval folk-lore."

The Dames Blanches have close counterparts in both name and characterization in neighboring northern countries: In Germany the Weiße Frauen and in the Dutch Low Countries the Witte Wieven.

See also
 La dame blanche (opera)
 Mont Blanc, nicknamed La Dame Blanche
 Moura Encantada
 White Goddess (Pan-European deity, posited by Robert Graves)
 White Lady, a type of ghost
 White Woman (disambiguation)

References

French mythology
French folklore
French legendary creatures
Norman folklore
Female legendary creatures

de:Weiße Frau
fr:Dame blanche (légende)